Dauphin River is a community in the Canadian province of Manitoba.

The name Dauphin River actually refers to two closely tied communities; Anama Bay and some members of Dauphin River First Nation. It is located at the mouth of the Dauphin River, where it empties into Lake Winnipeg at Sturgeon Bay. It became a recognized entity in March 1970 and is administered under the Northern Affairs Act by a mayor and council .

Demographics 

References 

 Dauphin River - Northern Affairs Community
 Google Maps

Designated places in Manitoba
Northern communities in Manitoba